Mount Lavinia Science College (විද්‍යා විද්‍යාලය) is a national school in the Piliyandala Zone, Sri Lanka. The school has risen to fame within a span of 40 years.

History

At the request of Poojya Mapalagama Vipulasara Himi of Rathmalana Paramadhammachethiya Pirivena, in 1977 the school was declared open by the Minister of Education, Al Haj Badl-ud-Din, as “Sri Sadhissara Maha Vidyalaya”. The first principal was L. P. Wijesundara. The school received the approval to teach science and commerce streams for grades 10 and 11.

In 1982, due to the influence of the Minister of Education, Ranil Wickramasinghe and Rathmalana Electorate parliament member Lalith Athulathmudali, the “Hena Para primary school” was joined with “Sri Sadhissara Maha Vidyalaya” creating a new school, South Colombo Science College.

Prof. L. A. Vitharana assumed duties as the first principal of the Science College. Vitharana was able to increase the number of students to 750. He was the pioneer of the school flag and the college song. During his tenure extracurricular activities of the college reached national level.

Past principals

 L. P. Wijesundara
 Prof. L. A. Vitharana
 K. K. Wijepala
 R.N.Edissooriya
 Kithsiri Samarasinghe
 P. D. Dahanayake
 Gamini Sisil Silva
 M. T. Tuder
 H. M. S. K. Kodikara
 Ananda Nagasinghe
 Dayarathna Bandara
 D. B. Peramuna

Houses

There are four houses at the college, students are allocated to them according to their admission number. The houses are: Faraday,Darwin and Luvi

Sports

Rugby
In 2015 Science College won the Milo President's Trophy Knockout Tournament for the first time, after they defeated Isipathana College, 21–18 in the final.

References

Educational institutions established in 1977
Schools in Colombo